Lars Ove Engblom (born April 4, 1955) is a Swedish curler.

Teams

References

External links
 

Living people
1955 births
Swedish male curlers
European curling champions
Swedish curling champions